Emilio Mori (20 June 1908 – 5 June 1998) was an Italian hurdler who competed at the 1936 Summer Olympics.

References

External links
 

1908 births
1998 deaths
Athletes (track and field) at the 1936 Summer Olympics
Italian male hurdlers
Olympic athletes of Italy